Tulsa King is an American crime drama television series created by Taylor Sheridan with Terence Winter showrunning for Paramount+. The series stars Sylvester Stallone, marking his first leading role in a  scripted television series. Stallone plays a Mafia capo who just got out of prison and is sent to Tulsa, Oklahoma, where he begins to set up a criminal organization. It premiered on November 13, 2022. In November 2022, the series was renewed for a second season.

Premise 
Dwight "The General" Manfredi is a New York Mafia capo who has just finished serving a 25-year prison sentence.  Upon release, his boss sends him to Tulsa, Oklahoma, to establish criminal operations there.  Not knowing anyone in the area, the General seeks a new crew to help establish his empire.

Cast

Main
 Sylvester Stallone as Dwight "The General" Manfredi, a capo in the Invernizzi family who is given Tulsa after serving 25 years in prison for murder.
 Andrea Savage as Stacy Beale, Manfredi's love interest and a senior ATF agent
 Martin Starr as Lawrence "Bodhi" Geigerman, a weed dealer recruited by Manfredi to help finance his syndicate
 Jay Will as Tyson Mitchell, a former taxi driver who becomes Dwight’s driver and the first member of the Manfredi syndicate.
 Max Casella as Armand "Manny" Truisi, a former Invernizzi soldier who made a new life in Tulsa working at Fennario horse ranch, after breaking his vow to the family. He joins Manfredi's crew after unsuccessfully trying to kill him.
 Domenick Lombardozzi as Don Charles "Chickie" Invernizzi, underboss of the Invernizzi family
 Vincent Piazza as Vince Antonacci, Chickie's top capo
 A.C. Peterson as Pete "The Rock" Invernizzi, ailing boss of the Invernizzi family
 Garrett Hedlund as Mitch Keller, an ex-rodeo star, ex-convict, and current bar owner who is an associate of the Manfredi syndicate
 Dana Delany as Margaret Devereaux, the owner of the Fennario horse ranch

Recurring
 Annabella Sciorra as Joanne Manfredi, Dwight's younger sister
 Ritchie Coster as Caolan Waltrip, the Irish leader of the outlaw biker club “The Black Macadams” 
 Emily Davis as Roxanne "Roxy" Harrington, Manny’s co-worker, a Black Macadams old lady, and an informant for Stacy.
 Ronnie Gene Blevins as Ben Hutchins
 Barry Corbin as Babe
 Michael Beach as Mark Mitchell, Tyson's father
 Tatiana Zappardino as Tina Manfredi, a Brooklyn florist and Dwight's estranged daughter
 Scarlet Rose Stallone as Spencer, a former waitress who Dwight hires to care for his prize horse.
 Chris Caldovino as Dennis "Goodie" Carangi, a member of Chickie's crew before joining Manfredi
 Alan Autry as Brian Gillen, former owner of Fennario Ranch and Margaret Devereaux's ex-husband

Episodes

Production 
Tulsa King was first announced in December 2021 as Kansas City, a new Paramount+ series created by Taylor Sheridan and showrun by Terence Winter.  Sylvester Stallone was cast in the lead role, where he made his scripted television debut.  It was ordered to series by February 2022, and the title and concept were reworked to take place in Tulsa instead of Kansas City, Missouri, with Max Casella, Domenick Lombardozzi, Vincent Piazza, and Jay Will added to the cast. In May, A.C. Peterson, Andrea Savage, Martin Starr, and Garrett Hedlund were cast. Dana Delany was added in June. In August, Annabella Sciorra was added to the cast.

Sheridan created the series during the COVID-19 pandemic, taking a week to come up with the idea, write the pilot, and recruit Stallone to the project. Some filming occcured in Tulsa on March 29, 2022, at Tulsa International Airport. Most interior filming occurred in Oklahoma City at Prairie Surf Media, which also hosted the production offices for the entire first season; most other exterior location filming also occurred there.

On November 30, 2022, Paramount+ renewed the series for a second season. In February 2023, Winter was announced to have stepped down as showrunner, due to creative differences, with search underway for a new showrunner. At this time it was also reported that the second season would not film in Oklahoma due to financial costs and complaints from the cast and crew who did not like the extreme Oklahoma temperatures.

Release 
The series initially premiered along with the first episode of Yellowstone's season 5 in a special screening in AMC theaters, October 29–30, 2022, prior to their release on Paramount+.

The series premiered on November 13, 2022, on Paramount+. The first two episodes of Tulsa King received special linear television airings on Paramount Network on November 20 and 27, serving as a lead-out for the fifth season of Yellowstone.

Reception
The review aggregator website Rotten Tomatoes reported a 79% approval rating and an average rating of 6.6/10, based on 47 reviews. The website's critics consensus reads, "Tulsa Kings stale comedy sometimes feels like ordering spaghetti with marinara and instead getting egg noodles and ketchup, but Sylvester Stallone still commands the screen with his swaggering charm." On Metacritic, it has a weighted average score of 65 out of 100 based on 28 critics, indicating "generally favorable reviews".

Libertarian commentator James Delingpole, an English journalist, writing in The Spectator, wondered "how morally warped does an audience have to be to root for a character whose primary goal is to transform somewhere relatively sweet and innocent into yet another urban cesspit?" and wrote that "the worrying suspicion arises that our perceived nostalgia for Stallone is being asked to do all the heavy lifting here."  He concluded that "writers Taylor Sheridan and Terence Winter could have exploited all this in a storyline that didn't leave such a nasty taste in the mouth."

The premiere episode that aired on Paramount Network on November 20, 2022, had 3.7 million viewers, "making it the best new linear cable premiere of 2022".

References

External links 
 
 

2020s American crime drama television series
2022 American television series debuts
English-language television shows
Paramount+ original programming
Television series about organized crime
Television series created by Taylor Sheridan
Television shows filmed in Oklahoma
Television shows set in Tulsa, Oklahoma
Works about the American Mafia